White Oak Creek is a  tributary of the Sulphur River in Texas. Via the Sulphur River, the creek is part of the Red River watershed, flowing to the Mississippi River and ultimately the Gulf of Mexico.

See also
List of rivers of Texas

References

USGS Hydrologic Unit Map - State of Texas (1974)

Rivers of Texas
Tributaries of the Red River of the South